Stefano Angioni (born 18 November 1939) is an Italian equestrian. He competed in two events at the 1972 Summer Olympics.

References

1939 births
Living people
Italian male equestrians
Olympic equestrians of Italy
Equestrians at the 1972 Summer Olympics
Sportspeople from Cagliari